Alistair Brown (born 12 April 1951) is a Scottish former football player who played as a striker. He made 496 league appearances over an eighteen-year career in the English Football League, scoring 141 goals.

He began his career at Leicester City, and helped to fire the "Foxes" to promotion out of the Second Division in 1970–71. He then helped the club to win the 1971 Charity Shield, before he moved on to West Bromwich Albion. He helped the "Baggies" to win promotion out of the Second Division in 1975–76, before helping the club to qualify for European football. He spent some time in 1981 playing in America for the Portland Timbers. In 1983, he moved to Walsall via Crystal Palace. He signed with Port Vale in July 1984, and helped the "Valiants" to win promotion out of the Fourth Division in 1985–86, before he retired in May 1986. A quality finisher, he was the top-scorer over the course of at least one season at Leicester, West Brom, Walsall, and Port Vale. He later worked as a pub landlord and warehouseman in the Midlands.

Playing career

Leicester City
Brown started his career at Leicester City, who were relegated out of the First Division in 1968–69. They finished third in the Second Division in 1969–70, two points shy of promotion. Brown finished as the club's top scorer in 1970–71 with 17 goals, as Leicester claimed promotion as the division's champions under Frank O'Farrell's stewardship. He played in the 1971 FA Charity Shield victory over Liverpool at Filbert Street. He was the club's top scorer again in 1971–72 under Jimmy Bloomfield, scoring seven goals, including one against rivals Nottingham Forest. He made 121 appearances for the "Foxes" in all competitions, scoring 35 goals. He then left Filbert Street for West Bromwich Albion after being sold for a £60,000 fee in March 1972.

West Bromwich Albion
West Brom suffered relegation out of the First Division under Don Howe in 1972–73, finishing four points short of safety. They finished five places and five points off the promotion places in 1973–74, before finishing three places and eight points short of promotion in 1974–75. Johnny Giles was then appointed as manager at The Hawthorns in July 1975, and Brown finished as the club's top scorer in 1975–76 with ten goals, as Albion secured the third and final promotion place by a one-point margin. They then finished seventh in 1976–77. Despite a managerial merry-go-round that saw Ronnie Allen replaced by John Wile and then Ron Atkinson, Albion managed to secure European football with a sixth-place finish in 1977–78. Brown scored 18 goals in 41 appearances in 1978–79, playing up front with Laurie Cunningham and Cyrille Regis, as the "Baggies" posted a third-place finish, some nine points behind champions Liverpool. They dropped to 10th in 1979–80, before shooting back up fourth in 1980–81, eight points behind champions Aston Villa. Brown played for Portland Timbers on loan in 1981, scoring nine goals and bagging six assists in 24 NASL appearances for Vic Crowe's side. However Atkinson left West Brom in 1981, along with Bryan Robson and Remi Moses, and Ronnie Allen could only take the club to two points above the drop zone in 1981–82. New boss Ron Wylie took the club back up to 11th in 1982–83, the last of Brown's ten seasons at the club. He made a total of 279 league appearances for the "Baggies", scoring 72 goals.

Later career
Brown joined Second Division Crystal Palace in March 1983. In August 1983, he moved on to Alan Buckley's Walsall in the Third Division. He finished as the club's top scorer in 1983–84 with 15 goals, his only season at Fellows Park. In July 1984 he joined Port Vale, then in the Fourth Division under John Rudge's stewardship, making his debut in a 1–0 defeat to Mansfield Town at Vale Park on 25 August 1984. With 21 goals in 49 games in the 1984–85 season he became the club's top scorer, forming a deadly forward pairing with Robbie Earle. However the next season he struggled with injuries and retired from the game in May 1986, at the age of 35. His six goals in 33 games did though help the secure the "Valiants" the fourth automatic promotion place. Despite smoking cigarettes during the half-time break, his experience on the field helped to improve the goal-scoring skills of Robbie Earle and Andy Jones.

Style of play
A cultured forward, he was a good finisher who could also hold the ball up well. He had an extremely powerful shot.

Post-retirement
After retiring, Brown ran the Cedar Tree Public House in Aldridge and then the Throstles Club in West Bromwich, before becoming a warehouseman in an iron foundry in Walsall.

Statistics
Source:

Honours
Leicester City
Football League Second Division champion: 1970–71
Charity Shield winner: 1971

West Bromwich Albion
Football League Second Division third place promotion: 1975–76

Port Vale
Football League Fourth Division fourth place promotion: 1985–86

References

1951 births
Living people
Footballers from East Lothian
Sportspeople from Musselburgh
Association football forwards
Scottish footballers
Leicester City F.C. players
West Bromwich Albion F.C. players
Scottish expatriate footballers
Scottish expatriate sportspeople in the United States
Expatriate soccer players in the United States
Portland Timbers (1975–1982) players
Crystal Palace F.C. players
Walsall F.C. players
Port Vale F.C. players
English Football League players
North American Soccer League (1968–1984) players